Ronald Lee Keller (born June 3, 1943) is a retired pitcher in Major League Baseball. He played for the Minnesota Twins. He is the father of Jason Keller, co-writer of the 2019 film Ford v Ferrari.

References

External links

1943 births
Living people
Major League Baseball pitchers
Minnesota Twins players
Baseball players from Indianapolis